The 1930 Harvard Crimson men's soccer team represented Harvard University during the 1930 ISFA season. It was the varsity program's 24th season of existence. 

Harvard won their fourth ever national championship, and to date, their most recent national championship. Harvard accumulated a record of 8-1-0 through nine matches. The title was shared with Penn and Yale.

Schedule 

|-
!colspan=6 style=""| Regular season

References

Harvard
Harvard Crimson men's soccer seasons
Intercollegiate Soccer Football Association Championship-winning seasons
Harvard Crimson men's soccer
1930s in Boston